Verse 29 of chapter 9 of the Qur'an is notable as dealing  with the imposition of tribute (ǧizya) on non-Muslims who have fallen under Muslim rule (the ahl al-ḏimma). Most Muslim commentators believe this verse was revealed at the time of the expedition to Tabuk.:239-240

Text
Verse as written in Arabic:

English translations of the verse:

Sahih International: Fight those who do not believe in Allah or in the Last Day and who do not consider unlawful what Allah and His Messenger have made unlawful and who do not adopt the religion of truth from those who were given the Scripture - [fight] until they give the jizyah willingly while they are humbled.
Muhsin Khan: Fight against those who (1) believe not in Allah, (2) nor in the Last Day, (3) nor forbid that which has been forbidden by Allah and His Messenger (4) and those who acknowledge not the religion of truth (i.e. Islam) among the people of the Scripture (Jews and Christians), until they pay the Jizyah with willing submission, and feel themselves subdued. 

Pickthall: Fight against such of those who have been given the Scripture as believe not in Allah nor the Last Day, and forbid not that which Allah hath forbidden by His messenger, and follow not the Religion of Truth, until they pay the tribute readily, being brought low.

Yusuf Ali: Fight those who believe not in Allah nor the Last Day, nor hold that forbidden which hath been forbidden by Allah and His Messenger, nor acknowledge the religion of Truth, (even if they are) of the People of the Book, until they pay the Jizya with willing submission, and feel themselves subdued.

Dr. Ghali: Fight the ones who do not believe in Allah nor in the Last Day, and do not prohibit whatever Allah and His Messenger have prohibited, and do not practice (Literally: to have as a religion) the religion of Truth-from among the ones to whom the Book was brought-until they give the tax out of hand (i.e., by a ready money payment, or in token of submission) and have been belittled..

Interpretations
The Muslim jurists and exegetes disagree primarily on two issues in regards to the exegesis and legal judgements on this verse. One issue is of the generality of the command to fight, which some from the early and classical jurists considered to be a universal command against disbelievers in general. The second issue is of how the jizya relates to the belittlement of the Disbelievers, whether that is by virtue of paying the jizya or expressed in the manner in which the Jizya is extracted from the dhimmi.

Al shafi’i the Imam of the Salaf from the 8th century  notably made the judgement that this verse applies on the basis of Religion rather than External aggression, and that the payment of the Jizya is one of two modes by which a Disbelieving man from the religion of the People of the Book can save his blood from being spilled. After mentioning the verse 9:29, 

Al shafi’i commented: So Allah protected the blood of those who follow the religion of the People of the Book either by their conversion into Islam(iman) or by their paying the Jizyah from their hands, while feeling themselves humiliated.

Somewhat anomalously, the modern 19th century Modern Islamic scholar Maududi also includes generally all disbelieving people in this group. Ibn Kathir writes, "Allah the Exalted encourages the believers to fight the polytheists, disbelieving Jews and Christians, who uttered this terrible statement [mentioned in Q9:30] and utter lies against Allah, the Exalted." 

Babarti al Hanafi of the fourteenth century also mentioned this verse and lengthily exposited its contrast to older Quranic verses enjoining peace, forbearance and the prohibition on offensive warfare, then invoked the doctrine of abrogation and emphasised the  generality of the targets of war identified by the verse. 

Babarti said: ‘If they fight you then fight them’(2:191) indicates that you may only fight the kuffar if they fight you, but it has been abrogated and the explanation is that Allah’s Messenger was initially commanded to forbear and turn away from the polytheists, with His saying, “forbear with a beautiful forbearance, and turn away from the polytheists.” Then He commanded him to call to the religion with admonishment and disputation with goodness, with His saying, “call unto the path of your Lord with wisdom.” Then he was permitted to fight when the initiation was from them, with His saying, “it is permitted for those who fight” and with His saying, “thus, if they fight you, then you fight them.” Then He commanded initiating fighting in some periods of time with His saying, “thus, when the sacred months have passed, fight the polytheists (9:5)”, then He commanded initiating fighting absolutely; in all time periods and places, He said, “and fight them until there be no fitnah(8.39) and ‘fight those who do not believe in Allah and the Last Day’ (9:29)

A second interpretation limits the application of this verse to the context of the Tabuk expedition which was a self-defence mobilisation by the Prophet Muhammad in response to rumours of a potential attack by the Byzantine Empire; therefore, only the belligerent Byzantines or others who act in similar aggression against the Muslims are the targets of this verse. Another interpretation, forwarded by Ghamidi in line with his general views on Islamic Jihad and Itmam al-Hujjah, limits the application of this verse to only the Muslim Prophet's non-Muslim addresses who lived in his time and region.

After mentioning the diverse array of interpretations, the influential scholar Al-Rāzī (d. 606/1210) quotes an early exegetical authority, Abū Rawq (d. 140/757), who said that this verse was not a unilateral condemnation of all Jews and Christians, but those "who do not heed the prescriptions contained in the Torah and the Gospel, respectively", while the famous Andalusian scholar al-Qurṭubī (d. 671/1273) "did not read into Qur'ān 9:29 a wholesale denunciation of the People of the Book as an undifferentiated collectivity.":278-279

The modern Salafi reformist scholar, Muḥammad 'Abduh (d. 1323/1905), "notes that most commentators are agreed that it was revealed on the occasion of the military campaign in Tabuk, and this verse specifically deals with the People of the Book", and also that "the only kind of legitimate war on which there is unanimity among Muslim scholars is the defensive war when proclaimed by the Imām in the event of an attack upon Muslim territory".:239-240 One of his disciples, the Grand Imam of al-Azhar from 1935 to 1945, Mustafa Al-Maraghi, explains that 9:29 means: "fight those mentioned when the conditions which necessitate fighting are present, namely, aggression against you or your country, oppression and persecution against you on account of your faith, or threatening your safety and security, as was committed against you by the Byzantines, which was what led to Tabuk."

Abrogation 
Allameh Tabatabaei, a Shia scholar, commenting on a hadith that claims that the above verse has "abrogated" other verses asking for good behaviour toward dhimmis, states that "abrogation" could be understood either in its terminological sense or its literal sense. If "abrogation" is understood in its terminological sense, Muslims should deal with dhimmis strictly in a good and decent manner.

Notes

References

Sharia
Quranic verses
Jihad
Offensive jihad
At-Tawba